Man Bites Dog (literally "It Happened Near Your Home") is a 1992 Belgian black comedy crime mockumentary film written, produced and directed by Rémy Belvaux, André Bonzel and Benoît Poelvoorde, who are also the film's co-editor, cinematographer and lead actor respectively.

The film follows a crew of filmmakers following a serial killer, recording his horrific crimes for a documentary they are producing. At first dispassionate observers, they find themselves increasingly caught up in the chaotic and nihilistic violence, eventually becoming accomplices. The film received the André Cavens Award for Best Film by the Belgian Film Critics Association (UCC). Since its release, the picture has become a cult film, and received a rare NC-17 rating for its release in the U.S.

Plot
Ben is a witty and charismatic but narcissistic and easily-enraged serial killer who holds forth at length about whatever comes to mind, be it the "craft" of murder, the failings of architecture, his own poetry, or classical music, which he plays with his girlfriend Valerie. A film crew joins him on his sadistic adventures, recording them for a fly on the wall documentary. Ben takes them to meet his family and friends while boasting of murdering many people at random and dumping their bodies in canals and quarries. The viewer witnesses these grisly killings in graphic detail.

Ben ventures into apartment buildings, explaining how it is more cost-effective to attack old people than young couples because the elderly have more cash at home and are easier to kill. In a following scene, he screams wildly at an elderly lady, causing her to have a heart attack. As she lies dying, he casually remarks that this method saved him a bullet. Ben continues his candid explanations and rampage, shooting, strangling, and beating to death anyone who comes his way: women, illegal immigrants and postmen (his favorite targets). He enjoys killing a postman at the start of the month because they tend to have parcels with money and other goods he can steal; enjoys killing women because they don't fight back; and enjoys killing immigrants because he's a total racist (he jokes about having murdered two Muslims and making sure to entomb their bodies in a wall that faces Mecca, and amuses himself by checking out the genitals of a black security guard after he's shot the man in the head).

The camera crew becomes more and more involved in the murders, starting out as silent accomplices but gradually assisting Ben in his killings. When Ben invades a home and kills an entire family, they help him hold down a young boy and smother him with a pillow, all the while keeping up a casual conversation. During filming, two of Ben's crew are killed; their deaths are later called "occupational hazards" by a crew member and off-handedly mourned. At the abandoned building that Ben uses for a hideout, the crew encounters two Italian criminals or gangsters also hiding out in the building. Ben kills the Italians before discovering that they were actually also being filmed by a competing documentary camera crew. Ben and his camera crew have fun taking turns as they shoot the rival crew members to death and record the whole thing.

While fooling around with crew, when Ben takes a couple having sex hostage in their own home, he holds the man at gunpoint while he and the crew gang-rape the woman. The following morning, the camera dispassionately records the aftermath: the woman has been butchered with a knife, her entrails spilling out, while the husband had his throat cut. Later, Ben's girlfriend and family receive death threats from the brother of one of the Italian criminals who Ben had killed earlier. Ben's violence becomes more and more random until he kills an acquaintance in front of his girlfriend and friends during a birthday dinner. Spattered with blood, they act as though nothing horrible has happened, continuing to offer Ben gifts. The film crew disposes of the body for Ben.

After a victim flees before he can be killed, Ben is arrested, but he escapes. At this point, someone, presumably the brother of the dead Italian along with other members of the two dead Italians' criminal organization, starts taking revenge on Ben and his family. Ben discovers that his girlfriend Valerie has been killed: a flautist, she has been murdered in a particularly humiliating manner, with her flute inserted into her anus. He later finds that his parents met the same fate, his mother, who owns a shop and is "not a musician", being sodomized with the end of a broomstick. This prompts Ben to decide that he must leave. He meets the camera crew to say farewell, but in the middle of reciting a poem, he is abruptly shot dead by an off-camera gunman. The camera crew is then picked off one by one. After the camera falls, it keeps running, and the film ends with the death of the fleeing sound recordist.

Cast
 Benoît Poelvoorde as Ben
 Valérie Parent as Valerie
 Rémy Belvaux as Remy (Reporter)
 André Bonzel as Andre (Cameraman)
 Jean-Marc Chenut as Patrick (Sound Man #1)
 Alain Oppezzi as Franco (Sound Man #2)
 Vincent Tavier as Vincent (Sound Man #3)

Production

Man Bites Dog is shot in black and white on 16mm film and was produced on a shoe-string budget by four student filmmakers, led by director Rémy Belvaux. The film's writers, Belvaux, Poelvoorde and Bonzel, all appear in the film using their own first names: Poelvoorde as Ben, the killer; Belvaux as Rémy, the director; and Bonzel as André, the camera operator. The genesis of the idea came from shooting a documentary without any money. Man Bites Dog is rated NC-17 by the Motion Picture Association of America for "strong graphic violence".

Although it is never shown or suggested in the film itself that Benoit kills a baby, the original poster features an image of a baby's pacifier with spattering blood coming from an unseen target at the end of Benoit's gun. For foreign release posters (not including the Region 4/Australian release), the baby's pacifier was changed to a set of dentures. In the R-rated version of the film that was made for the U.S. video audience (as NC-17 rated films were never allowed to be stocked at Blockbuster Video), the scenes where Ben and the crew work together to kill a young child are excised; the following scenes where Ben rapes a woman and the camera crew joins in are included but edited to have less nudity and gore.

Release

Theatrical release
Man Bites Dog was screened at the 1992 Cannes Film Festival where it won the International Critics' Prize, the SACD award for Best Feature and the Special Award of the Youth for directors Rémy Belvaux, André Bonzel and Benoît Poelvoorde. The film's controversial content and extreme violence was off-putting to some viewers, and resulted in the film being banned in Sweden. In 2003, the video was banned in Ireland.

Reception

Critical response
On review aggregator Rotten Tomatoes, Man Bites Dog holds an approval rating of 74%, based on 19 reviews, and an average rating of 7.4/10.

Kenneth Turan from the Los Angeles Times highly praised the film upon its release, writing, "Man Bites Dog defines audacity. An assured, seductive chamber of horrors, it marries nightmare with humor and then abruptly takes the laughter away. Intentionally disturbing, it is close to the last word about the nature of violence on film, a troubling, often funny vision of what the movies have done to our souls.... The deserving winner of the International Critics Award at Cannes ..." Film critic Rob Gonsalves called the film  "[an] original, a stark and (sorry) biting work far more complex, both stylistically and thematically, than first meets the eye." Stephen Holden of The New York Times called the film "a grisly sick joke of a film that some will find funny, others simply appalling." Holden concluded his review by stating that the film "gets carried away with its own cleverness. It makes the audience the butt of a nasty practical joke."

Box office
The film grossed $1.2 million in Belgium and more than $2 million in France. In the United States and Canada it grossed $205,569.

See also
Truth In Journalism

References

Bibliography
 Roscoe, Jane (2006): Man Bites Dog: Deconstructing the Documentary Look. In: Rhodes, Gary Don/Springer, John Parris (eds.) (2006): Docufictions. Essays on the intersection of documentary and fictional filmmaking. Jefferson, NC: McFarland, p. 205-215.

External links
 
 
 
 
Man Bites Dog: Cinema of Entrapment an essay by Matt Zoller Seitz at the Criterion Collection

1992 films
1992 comedy-drama films
1992 crime thriller films
1992 independent films
1990s French-language films
Belgium in fiction
Belgian black-and-white films
1990s black comedy films
1990s crime comedy films
Belgian black comedy films
Films about filmmaking
Films set in Belgium
Films shot in Brussels
Found footage films
Belgian independent films
1990s mockumentary films
Belgian satirical films
Self-reflexive films
1990s serial killer films
Films about snuff films
Obscenity controversies in film
Film censorship in Belgium
Film controversies in Belgium
Censored films
Torture in films
French-language Belgian films